Juan Barinaga may refer to:

 Juan Barinaga (footballer, born June 2000), Argentine midfielder
 Juan Barinaga (footballer, born October 2000), Argentine right-back